Edward Lester Smith (October 8, 1911September 20, 2002), stage name Bruce Edwards, was an American actor and photographer. He primarily played supporting roles in Hollywood films and film serials of the 1940s and early 1950s. After retiring in 1953, he pursued a photography career. A yachting enthusiast, he was also the owner-director of a summer camp for boys.

Early life and education
Edward Lester Smith was born on October 8, 1911, in Los Angeles, California. His parents were Clarence F. Smith and Susan Lotta. His father, a captain in the American Expeditionary Forces in World War I, was killed in action in 1918. He was raised by his mother. He graduated from Los Angeles High School and Menlo College.

Career

Actor

Using the stage name Bruce Edwards, he made his film debut in an uncredited role in Flight Command (1940). After several more uncredited appearances, he landed the male lead opposite Jane Withers in Small Town Deb (1942). After that he was mainly tapped for supporting roles, with the notable exception of starring as Stephen Colt in Republic Pictures' film serial The Black Widow (1947). Mayer compared the quality of Edwards' repartee with co-star Virginia Lindley to the verbal sparring between Cary Grant and Rosalind Russell in His Girl Friday (1940). Edwards appeared in two other film serials, including as the villainous Professor Paul Williams in the first six chapters of Federal Agents vs. Underworld, Inc (1948). At the end of his career he acted in low-budget westerns. He retired from Hollywood in 1953, but continued to make occasional guest appearances in film and television.

Photographer
Based in Newport Beach, California, Smith worked as a photographer.  He photographed covers and articles for the Los Angeles Times Home magazine. He and his wife also wrote for the Sea Larking column in the Daily Pilot and Bay Window for the Balboa Bay Club, a private yacht club.

Personal life
In March 1936, Smith married Virginia Brand Andrews, who had a daughter from a previous marriage. The couple's only child, Edward Lester Smith Jr., died one day after birth in July 1942 due to a cerebral hemorrhage. Virginia was often mentioned in the local press for her social and fundraising activities. Virginia died in 1984. In March 1987, Smith remarried to Edith Joyce Birdwell, who survived him.

A long-time resident of Lido Isle, Newport Beach, and La Quinta, California, Smith was a  yachting enthusiast. He spent summers with his family aboard his  sloop Typee in Cherry Cove, Catalina Island. He sold Typee in 1959, and in 1970 purchased a sloop named Sea Spree.

In 1959 he and his first wife opened the Catalina Marineros Camp in Fourth of July Cove, Catalina Island. A 1960 ad for the camp for boys ages 7 to 16 described the activities as "outboarding, sailing and marinero's skills plus riding, swimming, hiking, tennis, baseball and other sports". Smith and his first wife were avid tennis players as well.

Smith died on September 20, 2002, aged 90, in Thousand Oaks. No funeral services were conducted; he was cremated and his ashes strewn at sea near Cherry Cove.

Filmography

Sources:

References

Sources

External links
 
 

1911 births
2002 deaths
American male film actors
American male television actors
Male actors from Los Angeles
Photographers from California
20th-century American male actors
Los Angeles High School alumni
Menlo College alumni